Bonaduz railway station is a station in Bonaduz, Switzerland. It is located on the  gauge Landquart–Thusis line of the Rhaetian Railway.

Longer-distance trains to and from  stop at this station during the early morning and late evening only.

Services
The following services stop at Bonaduz:

 Chur S-Bahn:
 : hourly service between Rhäzüns and Schiers.
 : hourly service between Thusis and Chur.

References

External links
 
 

Railway stations in Switzerland opened in 1896
Railway stations in Graubünden
Rhaetian Railway stations